|}

The Princess Margaret Stakes is a Group 3 flat horse race in Great Britain open to two-year-old fillies. It is run at Ascot over a distance of 6 furlongs (1,207 metres), and it is scheduled to take place each year in July.

The event is named after Princess Margaret, the younger daughter of King George VI. It was established in 1946, and the inaugural running was won by Orum Blaze. For a period it was classed at Listed level, and it was promoted to Group 3 status in 1986.

The Princess Margaret Stakes is usually held at the same meeting as the King George VI and Queen Elizabeth Stakes but was run a week later in 2012.

Records
Leading jockey (10 wins):
 Lester Piggott – Parrotia (1958), Parquetta (1961), Soft Angels (1965), Fleet (1966), Star Story (1968), Secret Kiss (1971), Fiery Diplomat (1972), Roussalka (1974), Al Stanza (1976), Desirable (1983)

Leading trainer (5 wins):
 Sir Michael Stoute – Circus Ring (1981), Hiaam (1986), Enthused (2000), Russian Rhythm (2002), Visit (2007)

Winners since 1979

Earlier winners

 1946: Orum Blaze
 1947: Fair Dinah
 1948: Azolla
 1949: Rose of Torridge
 1950: Par Avion
 1951: Pareo
 1952: Blue Ballas
 1953: Holwood
 1954: Torbidora
 1955: Persian Fair
 1956: Taittinger
 1957: Medina
 1958: Parrotia
 1959: Lady Advocate
 1960: Abanilla
 1961: Parquetta
 1962: Palm Springs
 1963: High Powered
 1964: Attitude
 1965: Soft Angels
 1966: Fleet
 1967: Photo Flash
 1968: Star Story
 1969: Red Velvet
 1970: Boulevard
 1971: Secret Kiss
 1972: Fiery Diplomat
 1973: Celestial Dawn
 1974: Roussalka
 1975: Outer Circle
 1976: Al Stanza
 1977: Sarissa
 1978: Devon Ditty

See also
 Horse racing in Great Britain
 List of British flat horse races

References
 Racing Post:

 galopp-sieger.de – Princess Margaret Stakes.
 horseracingintfed.com – International Federation of Horseracing Authorities – Princess Margaret Stakes (2018).
 pedigreequery.com – Princess Margaret Stakes – Ascot.
 

Flat races in Great Britain
Ascot Racecourse
Flat horse races for two-year-old fillies
Recurring sporting events established in 1946
1946 establishments in England